Carlos Ramón Tábora Hernández (born 30 January 1965) is a Honduran football coach and former player. He coaches the Honduras national under-20 team.

Career

Player

As a player, Tábora had an ephemeral career in clubs of the Second Division of Honduras. He served as a central defender and played in clubs such as Independiente Villela and Hermacasa. However, he decided to end his football career early.

Coach

Independiente Villela

Tábora's first recorded experience was when he directed Independiente Villela, with which he achieved promotion to the Liga Nacional de Fútbol Profesional de Honduras in 1995.

Platense

In 2001, he was the interim coach of Platense of the National League.

Honduras national under-17 football team

He began his career as coach of national teams in 2002, when he directed the Honduras U-17 national team with the objective of qualifying for the U-17 World Cup in 2003 in Finland.

Villanueva

In 2007, he was announced as the coach of Villanueva of the Liga de Ascenso. In February 2008, after a series of poor results, he resigned from the technical direction of the club.

Parrillas One

In 2010, he coached Parrillas One in the Liga de Ascenso. That year, his team was champion of the Apertura Tournament.

Return to Villanueva

For the 2011 Apertura Tournament of the Liga de Ascenso, Tábora returned to coach the club. He debuted on August 12, 2011, during the 1–1 draw between Villanueva and Parrillas One.

Sula

On February 16, 2012, he was appointed and signed for Sula de La Lima, replacing Allan Bennett. He debuted on February 19 against West Olympia in the city of La Entrada. In his only managed tournament his team avoided relegation to the third division.

Honduras national under-21 football team

In March 2013, he led Honduras at the 2013 Central AKmerican Sports Games, where the Honduras U-21 national team became champion.

Honduras national under-15 football team

In August of that same year, he coached the Honduras Under-15 National Team in the 2013 CONCACAF Under-15 Championship. In that championship, his team (the same outcome of the same underage team of Honduras) also won the title of champion.

Parrillas One (2nd term)

On December 8, 2013, his return to the technical management of Parrillas One was announced, but this time in the top division of the league. Their first game was a 1–1 draw against Marathon at the Metropolitan Olympic Stadium in San Pedro Sula. After the tournament, his team was in seventh place in the standings with 20 points and failed to qualify to the league after falling to Motagua.

Platense (2nd term)

On February 2, 2015, he signed a one-year contract with Platense. He achieved an excellent participation in the cup tournament, losing the final against Olimpia. Unfortunately, their runners made a terrible campaign in the league, finishing in the tenth position.

Honduras national under-20 football team

Tábora coached the U-20 Honduras national team in the 2017 FIFA U-20 World Cup in South Korea. In that World Cup, his team finished in third place in Group E.

Honduras national team

On 26 February 2018, he was appointed as coach for the Honduras national football team.

Personal life

His parents are Abel Tábora and Enma Hernández. He was the oldest of five children.

Tábora graduated from the Francisco J. Mejía Institute in Olanchito and studied for two years at the Francisco Morazán Military Academy. He graduated in pedagogy from the National Pedagogical University of Francisco Morazán. For several years he was a professor at schools in San Pedro Sula (while coaching).

He married Dunia Meléndez, and they have three daughters, Luz Michelle, Rocío Julissa and Cristel Valencia.

References

1965 births
Living people
Independiente Villela players
Honduran football managers
Honduras national football team managers
Honduran sports coaches
Honduran footballers
Association football defenders